Islah Borj Al Shmali Club, or simply Islah, is a football club based in Tyre, Lebanon, that competes in the . Established in 1956, the club were promoted to the 2017–18 Lebanese Premier League, before being relegated back to the Lebanese Second Division.

Honours
 Lebanese Third Division
 Champions (1): 2013–14

See also 
 List of football clubs in Lebanon

References

Islah Borj Al Shmali Club
1956 establishments in Lebanon
Football clubs in Lebanon